Merrin may refer to:

 Merrin Dungey, American film and television actress
 Adam Merrin, American musician
 Trent Merrin, Australian professional rugby league footballer
 The Bridled nail-tail wallaby

Fictional
 Lankester Merrin, a fictional character in the novel The Exorcist

See also
 St Merryn, a village in Cornwall